Walter Holenweger (15 May 1933 – 7 July 2004) was a Swiss racing cyclist. He rode in the 1957 Tour de France.

References

1933 births
2004 deaths
Swiss male cyclists
Place of birth missing